Sun Moon Lake (Thao: Zintun) is a lake in Yuchi Township, Nantou County, Taiwan. It is the largest body of water in Taiwan. The area around the lake is home to the Thao tribe, one of aboriginal tribes of Taiwan. Sun Moon Lake surrounds a tiny island called Lalu. The east side of the lake resembles a sun while the west side resembles a moon, hence the name.

The area surrounding the lake has many trails for hiking.

While swimming in Sun Moon Lake is usually not permitted, there is an annual 3-km race called the Swimming Carnival of Sun Moon Lake held around the Mid-Autumn Festival each year. The Sun Moon Lake Swimming Carnival was launched in 1983 and is listed among the Top 50 Open Water Swims in Asia and the Top 100 Open Water Swims of the World. Everyone over 10 years old and with the ability to swim long distances can join, regardless of nationality. In recent years, the participants have numbered in the tens of thousands.  Other festivities held at the same time include fireworks, laser shows, and concerts.

The lake and its surrounding countryside have been designated one of thirteen national scenic areas in Taiwan. Wen Wu Temple was built after rising water levels from building a dam forced several smaller temples to be removed. Tzu-En Pagoda was ordered constructed by late President Chiang Kai-shek in 1971 in memory of his mother. Other temples of note include Jianjing Temple, Syuentzang Temple and Syuanguang Temple .

History

In older English literature, it was commonly referred to as Lake Candidius after the 17th century Dutch missionary Georgius Candidius.  In the middle of the lake is the Lalu Island, which is considered holy ground by the Thao tribe. In legend, Thao hunters discovered Sun Moon Lake while chasing a white deer through the surrounding mountains. The deer eventually led them to the lake, which they found to be not only beautiful, but abundant with fish. Today, the white deer of legends is immortalized as a marble statue on Lalu Island.

Under Japanese rule, the island was renamed .  After Chiang Kai-shek's Nationalist Government moved to Taiwan, the island was renamed Kwanghwa Island and in 1978 the local government built a pavilion where annual weddings took place.  In 1999, the 921 earthquake destroyed the pavilion and sank most of the island.  In recent years, due to increasing social and political awareness, more deference and recognition are being given to Taiwanese aborigines.  As a result, after the 921 earthquake, the island was renamed in the Thao language as "Lalu".

Several hydroelectric power plants have been built in the Sun Moon Lake since 1919, including Mingtan Pumped Storage Hydro Power Plant and Minhu Pumped Storage Hydro Power Station. When the first hydroelectric plant was finished in 1934, it was considered to be one of the most important infrastructure constructions of the time. Wujie Dam, also completed in 1934, diverts water from the Zhuoshui River to increase hydroelectric generation at the lake. The Jiji Line railroad was built to facilitate the construction.

Transportation

There are three ferry piers on the lake to serve ferries on the lake; they are Shuishe Pier, Xuanguang Pier and Ita Thao Pier. There is also a local bus service that goes around the lake with stops at major points along the perimeter of the lake.

The lake is accessible by bus from Taichung HSR station or Taichung TRA station. It is also accessible by bus from near Checheng railway station on the Jiji branch line.

The Sun Moon Lake Ropeway, located at the edge of the lake, connects it with the Formosan Aboriginal Culture Village.

Wildlife
The lake is a productive aquatic ecosystem. Introduced giant snakehead pose a challenge to the ecological balance of the lake and are a threat to native fish and shrimp species. The Nantou County Bureau of Agricultural Affairs has in place an eradication program for the species which attempts to electrofish schools of juvenile fish.

PRC passport
The depiction of Sun Moon Lake is featured in the newly-issued People's Republic of China passport in 2012, a move that has triggered protest from Taipei to Beijing.

Climate

See also
Mingtan Dam
Xuanzang Temple
Sun Moon Lake Wen Wu Temple
List of tourist attractions in Taiwan

References

External links 

 Sun Moon Lake website
 

Lakes of Taiwan
Landforms of Nantou County
Tourist attractions in Nantou County
National scenic areas of Taiwan